Animosity is the third studio album by American rock band Sevendust, released on November 13, 2001 through TVT Records. The album appeared on the Billboard 200, remained there for thirteen weeks and peaked at No. 28 on December 1, 2001. Animosity was certified gold on March 11, 2002 through the Recording Industry Association of America.

Sevendust released five variations of the album. Two variations were released in the United States with thirteen tracks, one version with explicit lyrics and the other with censored lyrics. Another explicit lyric version was released in the United States with a bonus track, and another censored version was released with two bonus tracks. The China release featured fifteen tracks. Five singles were released from the album, four of which appeared on the mainstream and modern Billboard charts.

"T.O.A.B." (Tits on a Boar) was featured in the computer animation Galerians: Rion.

"Angel's Son", originally released on Strait Up, a tribute album of Lynn Strait, former lead-singer of the band Snot. Strait died in a car accident on December 11, 1998, at the age of 30.

Track listing

Personnel

Sevendust
Lajon Witherspoon – lead vocals
Clint Lowery – lead guitar, backing vocals, co-lead vocals on "Xmas Day" and "Angel's Son"
John Connolly – rhythm guitar, backing vocals
Vinnie Hornsby – bass
Morgan Rose – drums, backing vocals

Additional musicians
Blumpy – additional keyboards, programming
Ben Grosse – programming
Aaron Lewis – additional vocals on "Follow"
Luis Resto – strings and  keyboards on "Xmas Day"
Justin Z. Walden – additional keyboards, programming

Production and management
Tony Adams – drum technician
Orville Almon Jr. - legal representation
Chuck Bailey – assistant engineer
Tom Baker – mastering
Adam Barber – digital recording and editing
Rick Behrens – assistant engineer
Blumpy – digital recording and editing
Jeff Cameron – executive producer, management

Norm Costa – drum technician
Toby Dearborn – assistant engineer
Ken Fermaglich – U.S. booking
Jay Jay French – executive producer
Steve Gottlieb – executive producer
Matthew Grasse – photography
Ben Grosse – producer, engineer, mixing, digital recording and editing
Jeff Hanson – executive producer, management
Robert Hannon – assistant engineer
David Johnson – business management
Jeff McAlear – assistant engineer
Brent Mullins – guitar technician
Michelle Oakes – A&R coordination
David "Bull" Parrish – guitar technician
Di Quon – A&R administration
Sean Roberts – A&R direction
Sevendust – co-producer
Thad Thompson – merchandising
Dan Tremonti – cover art & design
Alex Uyochocde – assistant engineer
Neil Warnock – worldwide booking
Garry Whitfield – business management

Charts

Album

Singles

Release history

References

Sevendust albums
2001 albums
TVT Records albums
Industrial metal albums